Lok or LOK may refer to:

Places
 Lok, Serbia, a village
 Lok, Levice District, Slovakia, a village
 Lok, Pakistan, a village
 Loka  (pronounced Lok): a plane of existence in Dharma

People

Surname Lok (English origin) 
 Anne Locke, Lock or Lok (1530–after 1590), English poet, translator and Calvinist
 William Lok (1480–1550), usher to Henry VIII
 Henry Lok (1553?-1608?), English poet, grandson of William Lok
 John Lok, English sea captain, son of William Lok
 Michael Lok, (c.1532–c.1621), English traveller, son of William Lok
 Rose Lok (1526–1613), English writer, daughter of William Lok

Surname Lok (Chinese origin 駱) 
 Anna Suk-Fong Lok, gastroenterologist at the University of Michigan
 Felix Lok (b. 1953), Hong Kong actor
 Rose Lok (pilot) (b. 1912)
 Lok Kwan Hoi, Hong Kong rower

Surname Lok (Other origins) 
 Cees Lok (born 1966), Dutch former footballer

Fictional characters
 Lok, the protagonist of William Golding's novel The Inheritors
 Lok, in the video game series Tak and the Power of Juju
 Lok Lambert, the protagonist of Huntik: Secrets and Seekers

Military
 Soyuz 7K-LOK, planned Soviet lunar vehicle
 LOK (Hellenic Army), Mountain Raider Companies (1946-1975)
 LOK, Cypriot National Guard Special Forces Groups

Entertainment
 The Legend of Korra, an animated series in the Avatar franchise
 Legends of Kesmai, an online game
 LOK (band), a Swedish hardcore band active 1995-2002

Politics
Lok (people in Hindi) may refer to:
Lok Sabha or People's Assembly, lower house of the Parliament of India

Political parties
Lok Dal, first to carry the name
Bharatiya Lok Dal
Indian National Lok Dal
Lok Dal (Charan), a political party in India
Lok Janshakti Party
Lok Satta Party
Lok Sewak Sangh
Lok Shakti
Punjab Lok Congress
Rashtriya Lok Dal
Rashtriya Lok Samata Party

See also
Jana (disambiguation), people in Hindi
Janata (disambiguation), people in Hindi
Awam (disambiguation), people in Urdu
Awami (disambiguation)